The Firebird is a 1934 American murder mystery film starring Verree Teasdale, Ricardo Cortez, Lionel Atwill and Anita Louise, directed by William Dieterle and produced and released by Warner Bros. It takes its title from the famed suite by Igor Stravinsky, which is heard occasionally during the film.

Plot

In Vienna, smarmy matinee idol Brandt moves into an upscale apartment building whose principal tenants are the elite Pointer family: John, Carola and daughter Mariette, who's just turned 18. One day, Brandt encounters Carola on the stairwell and insists she come up to his apartment that night, telling her if she doesn't, he'll tell her husband they had the affair anyway. Outraged, she files a formal complaint with the building's owners, demanding he be kicked out. But before that can happen, he is found dead from a gunshot wound. Naturally suspicion falls on a variety of suspects, most obviously John, and it's up to police inspector Miller to figure out which of them did it.

Cast
 Verree Teasdale as Carola Pointer
 Ricardo Cortez as Herman Brandt
 Lionel Atwill as John Pointer
 Anita Louise as Mariette Pointer
 C. Aubrey Smith as Police Inspector Miller
 Dorothy Tree as Mrs. Jolan Brandt
 Helen Trenholme as Mlle. Josephine Mousquet
 Hobart Cavanaugh as Emile
 Robert Barrat as Halasz
 Hal K. Dawson as Assistant Stage Manager
 Russell Hicks as Mr. Beyer
 Spencer Charters as Max Bauer
 Etienne Girardot as Professor Peterson
 Florence Fair as Thelma
 Nan Grey as Alice von Attem (as Nan Gray)
 Skippy as Rex (Uncredited)

Reception
The New York Times reviewer, Andre Sennwald, dismissed it as "an ordinary mystery melodrama." "Among the definite failings of this smoothly filmed edition of Lajos Zilahy's play is the circumstance that, like the original, it conceals the actual murderer from the audience for such an extended period that the motivation for the homicide never becomes completely real."

See also
Cette nuit-là (1933), French film based on the play Muvesz Szinhaz
The Open Door (1957), Spanish film based on the play Muvesz Szinhaz

References

External links
 
 
 

1934 mystery films
American mystery films
American black-and-white films
American films based on plays
Films directed by William Dieterle
Films set in Vienna
Films shot from the first-person perspective
Warner Bros. films
1930s American films
1930s English-language films